was a Japanese film director who was born in Tokyo.

Career
Self-taught, first making shorts on 8 mm film during the 1970s, he made his feature film debut with No Yōna Mono (Something Like It, 1981).

In 1983 he won acclaim for his movie Kazoku Gēmu (The Family Game), which was voted the best film of the year by Japanese critics in the Kinema Junpo magazine poll. This black comedy dealt with then-recent changes in the structure of Japanese home life. It also earned Morita the Directors Guild of Japan New Directors Award.

The director has been nominated for eight Japanese Academy Awards, winning the 2004 Best Director award for Ashura no Gotoku (Like Asura, 2003). He also won the award for best director at the 21st Yokohama Film Festival for 39 keihō dai sanjūkyū jō (Keiho, 2003) and the award for best screenplay at the 18th Yokohama Film Festival for Haru (1996). Sanjuro (2007) is a remake of the Kurosawa film

Death and legacy
Yoshimitsu Morita died from acute liver failure in Tokyo in December 2011. His last film Bokutachi kyūkō: A ressha de ikō (Take the "A" Train, 2011), a romantic comedy about two male train enthusiasts, was released in Japan in March 2012.

Filmography
 No Yōna Mono (1981) (Something Like It)
 Come On Girls! (Shibugakitai Boys & Girls, 1982)
 Zūmu Appu: Maruhon Uwasa no Sutorippa (also known as Uwasa no Stripper, 1982)
 Futoku Aishite Fukaku Aishite (Pink Cut, 1983)
 Kazoku Gēmu (The Family Game, 1983)
 Tokimeki ni Shisu (1984)
 Mein tēma (Main Theme, 1984)
 Sorekara (And Then, 1985)
 Sorobanzuku (1986)
 Kanashi Iro Yanen (1988)
 Ai to Heisei no Iro - Otoko (1989)
 Kitchen (1989)
 Oishii Kekkon (Happy Wedding) (1991)
 Mirai no Omoide (Future Memories: Last Christmas, 1992)
 Haru (1996)
 Shitsurakuen (A Lost Paradise, 1997)
 39 Keihō dai Sanjūkyū jō (Keiho, 1999)
 Kuroi Ie (The Black House, 1999)
 Mohou-han (Copycat Killer, (2002)
 Ashura no Gotoku (Like Asura, 2003)
 Umineko (The Seagull, 2004)
 Mamiya kyodai (The Mamiya Brothers, 2006)
 Sanjuro (2007)
 Southbound (2007)
 Bushi no kakeibo (Abacus and Sword, 2010)
 Watashi dasu wa (It's on Me, 2009)
 Bokutachi kyūkō: A ressha de ikō (Take the "A" Train, 2012)

References

External links
 
 
Davis, Bob "Morita Yoshimitsu"Senses of Cinema, February 2006.

1950 births
2011 deaths
Japan Academy Prize for Director of the Year winners
Japanese film directors
People from Tokyo